Hagerstrom or Hägerström is a Swedish surname. Notable people with the surname include:

Axel Hägerström (1868–1939), Swedish philosopher and jurist
James P. Hagerstrom (1921–1994), American Air Force pilot

See also
Hager

Swedish-language surnames